Moldova debuted in the Eurovision Song Contest 2005 with the song "Boonika bate doba" written by Mihai Gîncu and Roman Iagupov. The song was performed by the band Zdob și Zdub. The Moldovan broadcaster TeleRadio-Moldova (TRM) organised the national final O melodie pentru Europa 2005 in order to select the Moldovan entry for the 2005 contest in Kyiv, Ukraine. 35 entries competed to represent Moldova in Kyiv, with 15 being shortlisted to participate in the televised national final which took place on 26 February 2005. "Boonika bate doba" performed by Zdob și Zdub emerged as the winner after gaining the most points following the combination of votes from a jury panel and a public televote.

Moldova competed in the semi-final of the Eurovision Song Contest which took place on 19 May 2005. Performing during the show in position 4, "Boonika bate doba" was announced among the top 10 entries of the semi-final and therefore qualified to compete in the final on 21 May. It was later revealed that Moldova placed second out of the 25 participating countries in the semi-final with 207 points. In the final, Moldova performed in position 7 and placed sixth out of the 24 participating countries, scoring 148 points.

Background 

On 4 November 2004, the Moldovan national broadcaster, TeleRadio-Moldova (TRM), confirmed their intentions to participate at the 2005 Eurovision Song Contest for the first time. The nation had previously planned to debut at the Eurovision Song Contest in 1996. TRM would also broadcast the event within Moldova and organised the selection process for the nation's entry. For their 2005 participation, Moldova selected their entry via a national selection show.

Before Eurovision

O melodie pentru Europa 2005 
O melodie pentru Europa 2005 was the national final format developed by TRM in order to select Moldova's entry for the Eurovision Song Contest 2005. The event took place at the National Palace in Chișinău, hosted by Aurelia Vasilică and Valeriu Myrza, and included a final to be held on 26 February 2005. The show was broadcast on Moldova 1 and Radio Moldova.

Competing entries 
35 entries were received by the broadcaster after artists and composers were directly invited to submit their entries. A jury consisting of Lidia Panfil (director), Andrei Sava (composer), Teodor Radulescu (choreographer) and Anatol Kachuk (journalist and music expert) selected 15 finalists out of the 35 received entries, which were announced on 7 February 2005.

Final 
The final took place on 26 February 2005. Fifteen songs competed and the winner was selected based on the combination of a public televote and the votes of an expert jury. "Boonika bate doba" performed by Zdob și Zdub was selected as the winner.

At Eurovision
According to Eurovision rules, all nations with the exceptions of the host country, the "Big Four" (France, Germany, Spain and the United Kingdom), and the ten highest placed finishers in the 2004 contest are required to qualify from the semi-final on 19 May 2005 in order to compete for the final on 21 May 2005; the top ten countries from the semi-final progress to the final. On 22 March 2005, a special allocation draw was held which determined the running order for the semi-final and Moldova was set to perform in position 4, following the entry from Portugal and before the entry from Latvia. Zdob și Zdub were joined on stage by 52 year-old drummer Lidia Bejenaru for the stage performance and at the end of the show, Moldova was announced as having finished in the top 10 and subsequently qualifying for the grand final. It was later revealed that Moldova placed second in the semi-final, receiving a total of 207 points. The draw for the running order for the final was done by the presenters during the announcement of the ten qualifying countries during the semi-final and Moldova was drawn to perform in position 7, following the entry from Turkey and before the entry from Albania. Moldova placed sixth in the final, scoring 148 points.

The two shows were televised in Moldova on Moldova 1 and Radio Moldova. All broadcasts featured commentary by Vitalie Rotaru. The Moldovan spokesperson, who announced the Moldovan votes during the final, was Elena Camerzan.

Voting 
Below is a breakdown of points awarded to Moldova and awarded by Moldova in the semi-final and grand final of the contest. The nation awarded its 12 points to Romania in the semi-final and to Latvia in the final of the contest. Moldova only awarded 7 points to Romania in the final, which sparked controversy in the latter country as they considered the action as an "unfriendly gesture". TRM would later clarify that while Moldova's semi-final vote was based on 100 percent televoting, their vote in the final was based on 100 percent jury voting due to an insufficient number of valid votes cast during the televote period.

Points awarded to Moldova

Points awarded by Moldova

References

Bibliography 
 

2005
Countries in the Eurovision Song Contest 2005
Eurovision